Bishop Bohdan Manyshyn (born 24 October 1972 in Novyi Rozdil, Mykolaiv Raion, Lviv Oblast, Ukrainian SSR) is a Ukrainian Greek Catholic hierarch as Auxiliary bishop of Stryi since 2 April 2014.

Life
Bishop Manyshyn, after graduation of the school education, polytechnic college and an obligatory service in the Ukrainian Army, joined the Theological Seminary in Lviv.  After graduation he was ordained as deacon on 3 March 2002 and as priest on 15 September 2002, while he continued his study in the Catholic University of Lublin with license in the pastoral theology. During 2004–2014 he served as a parish priest in the different parishes of the Eparchy of Stryi.

On 2 April 2014 he was confirmed by the Pope Francis as an Auxiliary Bishop of Stryi, Ukraine and Titular Bishop of Lesvi. On 24 May 2014 he was consecrated as bishop by Major Archbishop Sviatoslav Shevchuk and other hierarchs of the Ukrainian Greek Catholic Church.

References

1972 births
Living people
People from Novyi Rozdil
John Paul II Catholic University of Lublin alumni
Ukrainian Eastern Catholics
Bishops of the Ukrainian Greek Catholic Church